Four Seasons Town Centre is a three-story shopping mall in Greensboro, North Carolina.  Opened in 1974, it was the first enclosed shopping center in Greensboro.  Currently it is anchored by Dillard's and JCPenney and it is the only indoor shopping mall within Greensboro's city limits; however, nearby Friendly Center, an outdoor shopping plaza, has many of the same tenants. It is managed by Brookfield Properties. The shopping mall is located at the I-40 interchange with Gate City Boulevard (formerly High Point Road), southwest of downtown.

History 
Assembly of the land that would eventually become the site of Four Seasons Mall began in late 1958, when Joseph S. Koury, a local developer, began purchasing land south of downtown Greensboro with the intent of developing new suburban housing and shopping centers.  The Four Seasons site, at the new intersection of Interstate 40 and US 29-A/US 70-A (modern day Gate City Boulevard), was earmarked as the location for the signature development of Imperial Corporation, the predecessor company to Koury Corporation, which was also owned and operated by Koury.

The first development on the site, a Holiday Inn hotel, opened in 1970.  The mall eventually followed, with two levels and 900,000 square feet (84,000 m2) of GLA, opening in stages. JCPenney opened August 7. 1974, while much of the mall interior opened October 30, 1974, and Belk opened February 6, 1975, with an official dedication of the property held on that date. The mall was designed for expansion, with the main mall building featuring both a third floor and basement level, both of which would eventually be used for retail space in the mall's future.

Originally known as Four Seasons Mall, it featured Belk, JCPenney, and Meyer's, a Greensboro-based department store owned by Allied Stores, as primary anchors. Miller & Rhoads, Frankenberger's, Thalhimer's and McCrory's were secondary anchors. There were also large Eckerd Drugs and Winn Dixie stores at Four Seasons, as well as a Piccadilly Cafeteria and a four-screen General Cinemas, which opened in 1979.

Meyer's was soon replaced by Jordan Marsh, another Allied Stores nameplate, and that space was sold to Ivey's by 1980. JCPenney discontinued its auto service operation at Four Seasons in 1983, and the freestanding building that housed it was razed a few years later.

In 1987, Four Seasons Mall completed its third story expansion, giving the mall over 1 million square feet (93,000 m2) of GLA, 200 stores and a large new food court.  It also assumed its current name at that time, along with a new, more contemporary logo.

Ivey's was acquired by Dillard's in 1990, just after a major renovation to its store that connected it to the mall's new third level, and Thalhimers was sold to the May Department Stores Co. later that same year.

It was scheduled to be replaced with a Hecht's store, but May instead decided to expand its Friendly Center Hecht's and build a freestanding Hecht's three miles (5 km) west of Four Seasons at Interstate 40 and Wendover Avenue.

In the late 1990s, Four Seasons Town Centre further renovated its interior with a dramatic redesign by Thompson, Ventulett, Stainback & Associates.  This renovation added a large fountain and amphitheater to the mall's center court.  A number of permanent vendor spaces and kiosks were added to the mall's large corridors, as well as living room-like soft seating areas.

Additionally, all exterior public mall entrances were redesigned over a period of three years following the Dillard's renovation.

In the early 2000s, the closure and demolition of Carolina Circle Mall left Four Seasons as the only enclosed shopping mall in Greensboro.

In 2004, the mall was sold to General Growth Properties (now Brookfield Properties).

On May 19, 2014, Belk announced that its Four Seasons location would close in February 2015. In a statement, Belk officials said they want to "focus our resources and efforts on the major expansion and remodeling of our Friendly Center store, which we will reopen this fall as a Belk flagship store." After a store closing sale that started on November 8, 2014, the store closed for good on January 18, 2015, just short of its 40th anniversary at the mall.

On April 25, 2016, local news sources reported that Dillard's planned to relocate to the former Belk location. Dillard's opened in its new location on October 25 of that year and briefly operated a clearance center in its old location to clear out excess merchandise. Round1 Bowling & Amusement, a Japanese entertainment company, opened on the first floor of the former Dillard's in January 2018. Round1's Greensboro site is the company's 20th entertainment center in the United States.

See also 
 Carolina Circle Mall
 Friendly Center

References

External links 
 Four Seasons Town Centre

Brookfield Properties
Shopping malls in Greensboro, North Carolina
Shopping malls established in 1974
1974 establishments in North Carolina